Broome Stages is a 1931 historical novel by the British writer Clemence Dane. It charts the fortunes of the Broomes, a theatrical dynasty, over two hundred years from Queen Anne's reign through to the present cinema era. It was one of Dane's most popular works.

Adaptation
In 1966 it was made into an eight-part television series Broome Stages by the BBC featuring Gwen Watford, Richard Pasco and Robin Phillips.

References

Bibliography
 Frierson, William Coleman . The English Novel in Transition 1885-1940. Cooper Square Publishers, 1965 .
 Hartley, Cathy. A Historical Dictionary of British Women. Routledge, 2013.

1931 British novels
Novels by Clemence Dane
British historical novels
British novels adapted into television shows
Novels set in the 18th century
Novels set in the 19th century
Heinemann (publisher) books
Doubleday, Doran books